The 1936 West Virginia State Yellow Jackets football team was an American football team that represented West Virginia State College during the 1936 college football season. Under head coach Adolph Hamblin, the team compiled a 7–0–1 record and outscored opponents by a total of 110 to 12. The team was recognized as the black college national co-champion along with Virginia State.

Floyd "Butch" Meadows of West Virginia State was selected as the first-team quarterback on the Pittsburgh Courier's 1936 All-America team.

West Virginia State College had an enrollment of 664 students in the fall of 1936.

Schedule

References

West Virginia State
West Virginia State Yellow Jackets football seasons
Black college football national champions
College football undefeated seasons
West Virginia State Yellow Jackets football